Cornettsville is an unincorporated community in Bogard Township, Daviess County, Indiana, United States.

History
Cornettsville was laid out in 1875. It was named for one of its founders, Samuel Cornett. A post office was established at Cornettsville in 1878, and remained in operation until it was discontinued in 1902.

The town's name was to be decided by which family was the largest in number at that time. The Cornett family and Myers families were the largest.  The Cornetts won by one person.

Geography

References

External links

Unincorporated communities in Daviess County, Indiana
Unincorporated communities in Indiana
1875 establishments in Indiana
Populated places established in 1875